Melvin Riley Baldwin (April 12, 1838April 15, 1901) was an American railroad engineer and Democratic politician.  He served one term in the United States House of Representatives, representing Minnesota in the Fifty-third Congress.  Earlier, he served in the Iron Brigade of the Army of the Potomac through most of the American Civil War.

Early life and education
Baldwin was born near Chester, Vermont, on April 12, 1838, and moved with his parents to Oshkosh, Wisconsin Territory, in 1847.  He attended the common schools there and entered Lawrence University, Appleton, Wisconsin, in 1855.  He studied law but adopted civil engineering as a profession.

Career and service in the Civil War
He was engaged on the Chicago & North Western Railway until April 19, 1861, when he enlisted as a private in Company E, 2nd Wisconsin Infantry Regiment due to the Civil War. He was commissioned captain of his company and was later captured at Gettysburg and confined in Libby Prison, Richmond, Virginia, at Macon, Georgia, and at Charleston and Columbia, South Carolina, being prisoner for eighteen months.

After the war, he engaged in operative railway work in Kansas, being general superintendent for four years.  He moved to Duluth, Minnesota, in 1885.

U.S. Representative
Baldwin was elected as a Democrat to the 53rd congress, (March 4, 1893 – March 3, 1895), but lost his bid for reelection in 1894 to the 54th congress.

Later life
Baldwin was chairman of the Chippewa Indian Commission from 1894 to 1897. He traveled to Alaska in November 1897 and died in Seattle, Washington, April 15, 1901. He committed suicide because of a financial failure. He is interred in Forest Hill Cemetery, Duluth, Minnesota.

References

External links
 Retrieved on 2008-02-14

|-

1838 births
1901 suicides
People from Windsor County, Vermont
Democratic Party members of the United States House of Representatives from Minnesota
19th-century American politicians
Union Army officers
People of Wisconsin in the American Civil War
American Civil War prisoners of war